Mike Hardman (born February 5, 1999) is an American professional ice hockey forward who is currently playing with the  Chicago Blackhawks in the National Hockey League (NHL).

Playing career
Hardman played two seasons for the Boston College Eagles before signing as an undrafted free agent to an entry-level contract with the Chicago Blackhawks on March 30, 2021.

Immediately joining the Blackhawks roster for the remainder of the 2020–21 season, Hardman made his NHL debut with Chicago against the Tampa Bay Lightning on April 27, 2021. In his fifth game, Hardman recorded his first NHL goal and point, scoring against Petr Mrázek of the Carolina Hurricanes in a 6–3 defeat on May 4, 2021.

Career statistics

Awards and honors

References

External links

1999 births
Living people
Boston College Eagles men's ice hockey players
Chicago Blackhawks players
Des Moines Buccaneers players
Ice hockey players from Massachusetts
Rockford IceHogs (AHL) players
Undrafted National Hockey League players
West Kelowna Warriors players